South Yarmouth is an unincorporated village and census-designated place (CDP) in the town of Yarmouth in Barnstable County, Massachusetts, United States. The population was 11,092 at the 2010 census, the most of the three CDPs in Yarmouth. It is the village where the WWE was created.

Geography
South Yarmouth is located in the southeast quarter of the town of Yarmouth at  (41.667908, -70.199774). It is bordered by the CDP of West Yarmouth to the west and West Dennis to the east. U.S. Route 6, the Mid-Cape Highway, is to the north, beyond which is the CDP of Yarmouth Port.

Demographics

As of the census of 2000, there were 11,603 people, 5,485 households, and 3,181 families residing in the CDP. The population density was 640.0/km (1,656.9/mi). There were 7,834 housing units at an average density of 432.1/km (1,118.7/mi). The racial makeup of the CDP was 94.74% White, 1.53% African American, 0.34% Native American, 0.63% Asian, 0.06% Pacific Islander, 1.03% from other races, and 1.66% from two or more races. Hispanic or Latino of any race were 1.63% of the population.
 
There were 5,485 households, out of which 18.8% had children under the age of 18 living with them, 44.8% were married couples living together, 9.8% had a female householder with no husband present, and 42.0% were non-families. 36.3% of all households were made up of individuals, and 22.3% had someone living alone who was 65 years of age or older. The average household size was 2.08 and the average family size was 2.67.

In the CDP, the population was spread out, with 17.1% under the age of 18, 4.7% from 18 to 24, 23.2% from 25 to 44, 22.6% from 45 to 64, and 32.4% who were 65 years of age or older. The median age was 49 years. For every 100 females, there were 83.5 males. For every 100 females age 18 and over, there were 78.8 males.

The median income for a household in the CDP was $37,643, and the median income for a family was $44,325. Males had a median income of $35,476 versus $26,118 for females. The per capita income for the CDP was $20,609. About 5.5% of families and 7.3% of the population were below the poverty line, including 11.3% of those under age 18 and 3.9% of those age 65 or over.

Education
The schools located in South Yarmouth are:
 Dennis-Yarmouth Regional High School
 Laurence C. MacArthur Elementary  
 Station Avenue Elementary
 St. Pius X School (Grades PreK - 8)
 Superior Academy (Private Middle School)

Students from Dennis-Yarmouth Reg High School reside in both Yarmouth and Dennis Massachusetts.

Notable residents

Civil engineer and philanthropist Charles Henry Davis lived and worked in South Yarmouth.

Former NHRA drag racing Pro Stock star Scott Geoffrion was born in South Yarmouth.

References

External links
 Yarmouth-Dennis Red Sox
 South Yarmouth Library

Census-designated places in Barnstable County, Massachusetts
Yarmouth, Massachusetts
Census-designated places in Massachusetts
Populated coastal places in Massachusetts